The 1941–42 OB I bajnokság season was the sixth season of the OB I bajnokság, the top level of ice hockey in Hungary. The top two teams out of the Budapest Group and the Erdely group qualified for the final round. BKE Budapest won the championship.

Regular season

Budapest Group

Erdély Group

Final round

Semifinals 
 BBTE Budapest - Csíkszeredai TE 11:0
 BKE Budapest - Kolozsvári KE 4:0

3rd place 
 Kolozsvári KE - Csíkszeredai TE 2:1 n.V.

Final 
 BKE Budapest - BBTE Budapest 4:0

External links
 Season on hockeyarchives.info

Hun
OB I bajnoksag seasons
1941–42 in Hungarian ice hockey